Abhijith P. S. Nair (born 18 October 1991) is an Indian violinist, arranger and composer.

Performing career
Abhijith became acquainted with folk and classical styles and began performing onstage improvisations. His fusion violin shows and albums gained him popularity.

He has performed with various artists including Dr. K. J. Yesudas, Hariharan, Shankar Mahadevan, Sivamani, Mandolin U. Rajesh, Mattannoor Sankarankutty Marar, Stephen Devassy, Senri Kawaguchi and Mohini Dey. For his first international instrumental jazz fusion album Saraswati At Montreux, he collaborated with drummer Dave Weckl. Abhijith is the worldwide ambassador of cantini violin.

Works

References

External links
 
 
 Abhijith P S Nair - Violinist -facebook.com
 Abhijith P S Nair - Music -kkbox.com
 Akashangalil - Album -malayalasangeetham.info
 Abhijith P S Nair - Violin fusion -reelstube.com
 Abhijith P S Nair -musical flashmob-zaclip.com
 Abhijith P S Nair -'sarawathy at montreux'-with Dave Weckl-shazam.com
 Abhijith P S Nair -Sivamani-Mohini Dey-chordify.net
 Cantini-violin-launch-in-India-wtzupcity.com
 Saraswati at Montreux-bbc.co.uk
 Cantini, The Italian brand comes to India-fwdlife.in
 cantini electric violin-cantinielectricviolins.com
 Dandalayya Song in Bahubali movie-manoramaonline.com
 A R Rahman Cover Versions-manoramaonline.com
 Saraswati at Montreux-bbc.co.uk
 Abhijith P S Nair team up with incredible musicians-musiccrowns.org
 stringent focus-newindianexpress.com
 Abhijith P S Nair talks about his musical innovations-indulgexpress.com
 SARASWATI AT MONTREUX-urbansuitejazz.com
 Akashangalil-eastcoastaudios.in
 Abhijith P S Nair-store.cdbaby.com
 Abhijith. P. S. Nair-itunes.apple.com
 Saraswathy at Montreux-open.spotify.com
 Ekalavya-abhijithviolin.bandcamp.com
 Abhijith P S Nair-moviebuff.com

1991 births
Living people
Musicians from Kerala
People from Kottayam district
Indian violinists
Indian male classical musicians
21st-century violinists
21st-century male musicians